"I Wish U Heaven" is a song by Prince, and the third single from his 1988 album, Lovesexy. The 12" single is a substantially extended three-part suite which runs over ten minutes. This song was a replacement for "The Line", an upbeat jam featuring Boni Boyer and Sheila E. on backing vocals. "I Wish U Heaven" is a joyful, spiritual song with few lyrics

The B-side, "Scarlet Pussy", is credited to Prince's alter ego, Camille. The song is very sexual, using metaphors of cats and dogs for sexual organs, a theme Prince previously used for the B-side "La, La, La, He, He, Hee". Prince uses his sped-up Camille vocals, as well as a slowed-down vocal, similar to "Bob George" from The Black Album. The song features a saxophone solo from Eric Leeds. The decision to include such a raunchy song with the spiritual A-side was noteworthy. The edit of "Scarlet Pussy" was included on 1993's The Hits/The B-Sides.

Composition
Part One of the mix starts with a stripped-down version of the Lovesexy album song, remixed with a dance beat. The original drum programming and rhythmic electric guitar riffs are deleted for much of the song.

Part Two is a gospel rendition with new lyrics, continuing the spiritual theme. This part of the song was often sung in concert during the Lovesexy World Tour. The beginning of this section paraphrases lyrics from "Housequake", from the previous album Sign "☮" the Times. Prince also quotes the film Scarface with the lines "Say hello to my little friend..." and then introduces the "Blue Angel", a new blue version of his custom "White Cloud" guitar featured in the film Purple Rain. Sheila E. is also given a call out, and her voice can be heard responding in this section.

Part Three is based on an outtake called "Take This Beat" and deviates quite a bit from the original theme.  This segment has Prince using his "Jamie Starr" persona to humorously tout the fact that he's funky, musically talented, and has plenty of beats (songs) that are "so fine".  The song ends with a looped repeat of the title. This version of the song became one of the highlights during the supporting tour in which Prince would usually order the house lights to be turned up, and instruct the crowd during a call and response segment.

Reception
Cash Box called Prince's performance "heavenly".

Track listing
7" single / Cassette single
 "I Wish U Heaven" (LP Version) – 2:43
 "Scarlet Pussy" (Edit) – 4:10

12" single / CD single
 "I Wish U Heaven (Part 1, 2 & 3)" – 10:13
 "Scarlet Pussy" – 6:09

Charts

References

Prince (musician) songs
Songs written by Prince (musician)
1988 singles
Darren Hayes songs
Paisley Park Records singles
Warner Records singles
Music videos directed by Jean-Baptiste Mondino
Song recordings produced by Prince (musician)
1988 songs